Abdoul Aziz Kaboré (born 1 January 1994) is a Burkinabé professional footballer who plays as a defensive midfielder for Luxembourgian team Union Titus Pétange. Between 2015 and 2016, he made three appearances for the Burkina Faso national team.

Career
Born in Ouagadougou, Kaboré spent his early career playing for French teams Valenciennes and Boulogne. He moved to Fleury 91 in January 2019. Ahead of the 2019–20 season, he then joined Luxembourgian team Union Titus Pétange.

He made his senior international debut for Burkina Faso in 2015.

References

1994 births
Living people
Association football midfielders
Burkinabé footballers
Burkina Faso international footballers
Ligue 2 players
Championnat National 2 players
Championnat National 3 players
Luxembourg National Division players
Valenciennes FC players
US Boulogne players
FC Fleury 91 players
Union Titus Pétange players
F91 Dudelange players
Burkinabé expatriate footballers
Burkinabé expatriate sportspeople in France
Expatriate footballers in France
Burkinabé expatriate sportspeople in Luxembourg
Expatriate footballers in Luxembourg
21st-century Burkinabé people